Septimus Rameau (1826-1876) was a Haitian politician who was viewed as the power behind the 1874-1876 presidency of Michel Domingue.

Rameau was born on September 19, 1826. Rameau was Domingue's nephew. Domingue, who was primarily a soldier, had neither the stature nor the tact of a statesman. He therefore issued a decree on September 10, 1874 appointing Rameau to manage public functions as the Vice-President of the Council of Secretaries of State. Septimus Rameau thus became the true ruler of Haiti. Rameau was dictatorial and domineering by nature, while Michel Domingue was more of a figurehead. He was Minister of Finance in 1871.

In connection with the Boisrond-Canal Affair, Generals Brice and Pierre Monplaisir Pierre were killed. Septimus Rameau was accused of being responsible for the deaths of the two generals, as well as a controversial proposed loan with France. He was assassinated on a street in Port-au-Prince on April 15, 1876.

References 

Haitian politicians
1876 deaths
1826 births
Finance ministers of Haiti